Ożenna  (Ozhynna) is a village in the administrative district of Gmina Krempna, within Jasło County, Subcarpathian Voivodeship, in south-eastern Poland, close to the border with Slovakia.

The village has a population of 120. Prior to Operation Vistula it was largely inhabited by Lemkos.

Three World War I cemeteries are located in the village.

References

Villages in Jasło County